Lee Dae-hwi (Hangul: 이대휘, born January 29, 2001), better known mononymously as Daehwi, is a South Korean singer-songwriter, producer and television personality. He is a member of South Korean boy group AB6IX, and is known for his participation in the reality competition show Produce 101 Season 2, where he finished in third place overall and became a member of the boy group Wanna One. As the group promoted for a year and a half, it achieved both critical and commercial success with all four of its albums topping South Korea's Gaon Album Chart and all five of its lead singles ranking in the top three of South Korea's Gaon Digital Chart. He released the song "Candle" with Park Woo-jin which reached number 60 on the Gaon Single Chart. In addition to singing and writing songs for various artists, he guest hosted and then became the permanent host for the long-time running variety show M Countdown.

Early life and education 
Lee Dae-hwi was born in Seoul, South Korea. His father passed away when he was six years old due to liver cirrhosis. He had lived in Osaka, Japan, for two years and Los Angeles, United States, for six years. He started his path as an idol after he passed the JYP Entertainment's Global Audition in the United States to begin his trainee life in South Korea in 2015. Around late 2016 he got accepted in Brand New Music through audition. In 2019, he graduated from School of Performing Arts Seoul as a Department of Stage Arts major. He currently attends Global Cyber University as a Broadcasting and Entertainment major.

Career

Pre-debut: Produce 101 
In 2017, Lee participated in Produce 101 Season 2, a reality competition show broadcast on Mnet which produces a boy band from a field of 101 contestants. Lee became the first center performer for the program's promotional theme song, "Pick Me". He participated on the program along with Brand New Music representative trainees Park Woo-jin, Im Young-min and Kim Dong-hyun. In the finale, he finished in third place with 1,102,005 votes, securing him a spot as a member of the boy band which was named Wanna One.

2017–2018: Wanna One, guest hosting 
Wanna One debuted at the Wanna One Premier Show-Con on August 7, 2017, at the Gocheok Sky Dome with the mini-album 1×1=1 (To Be One). He went on to represent the group in several appearances on variety shows such as Saturday Night Live Korea, Wednesday Food Talk, Amazing Saturday, Produce 48, Visiting Tutor and King of Masked Singer.

He also continued to promote with Wanna One, including as a part of Wanna One's unit The Heal, as a duo with fellow member Ong Seong-wu. He participated as a lyricist of the unit's song, "Sandglass", which is produced by Heize.
The group disbanded in January 2019.

In 2018, Lee was involved in several prominent solo activities as an emcee. He was part of Global MC Crew on M Countdown, a music program on Mnet. He has also participated as a special emcee on music programs such as Inkigayo, M Countdown in Thailand, and the music festival KCON 2017–2018 during its stops in Los Angeles, Australia, Japan, New York, and Thailand.

Lee has also composed and produced songs for the Produce 101 shows. During the first evaluation of the Produce 101 Season 2 program, he performed his own composed song, titled "Hollywood". After his debut in Wanna One, Lee had been actively released his own songs under his label, Brand New Music. His first released song under the label was "Good Day" which was included in MXM's first digital single.

In 2018, Lee participated in the Mnet competition program Produce 48 as one of producer for the Concept songs, which was titled "See You Again". His other composed songs for his labelmates includes "Remember Me" by Kang Min-hee, "Wish You Love Me" and "Dawn", which was included on the MXM's first album More Than Ever.

2019–present: Solo single and AB6IX debut
In January 2019, Lee collaborated with fellow labelmate Park Woo-jin and released a single titled "Candle". The song reached number 60 on the Gaon Single Chart. Lee also joined Brand New Music's boy band AB6IX, which debuted in May.

Lee wrote the song "Slow" for Yoon Ji-sung's debut album Aside, the song "Young20" for Park Ji-hoon, and the song "Airplane" from Iz*One's second mini album Heart*Iz.

In April 2019, he and Han Hyun-min became official permanent co-hosts on M Countdown. His final broadcast as MC for the show was in February 2021.

Lee is set to make his acting debut as the male lead Dong Jin-woo in SBS’s mobile platform Mobidic short drama called Mon Chouchou Global House. The drama will begin filming in August and premiere in October.

On December 16, 2020 it was confirmed that Lee would be producing songs for Mnet's audition show CAP-TEEN.

Daehwi participated in the music competition show Listen Up, competing against producers from across the K-pop industry. In the finale, on October 8th, 2022 it was announced he had finished the show in 1st place.

Other ventures

Endorsement 
In April 2019, Lee was selected for his first solo endorsement deal as a campaign model of Coca-Cola Korea beverage brand, Fanta pineapple flavor.

Discography

Songs

As producer / songwriter 
All credits are adapted from Korea Music Copyright Association unless stated otherwise.

Filmography

Reality shows

Television series

Television shows

Hosting

Web shows

Radio shows

Music videos

Awards and nominations

Notes

References

External links 

 

2001 births
Living people
Swing Entertainment artists
Singers from Seoul
Produce 101 contestants
South Korean television personalities
South Korean male idols
South Korean male singers
South Korean dance musicians
South Korean singer-songwriters
South Korean record producers
21st-century South Korean singers
Reality show winners
Wanna One members
AB6IX members
Brand New Music artists
School of Performing Arts Seoul alumni
South Korean male singer-songwriters
Japanese-language singers of South Korea
English-language singers from South Korea